Amol, also Alatil or Aru, is a Torricelli language of Papua New Guinea.  The names Amol and Aru are both slightly erroneous.  Speakers of the language call their language Mol (not Amol), while speakers of surrounding languages call the language Oru (not Aru).  Matthew S. Dryer of the University at Buffalo has collected data on Mol.

References

Palei languages
Languages of Sandaun Province